Andrejs Štolcers (born 8 July 1974) is a Latvian former professional footballer who played as an attacking midfielder.

Club career 
Born in Riga, Latvia, Štolcers started his career for Olimpija Rīga. He played there for two years from 1992 to 1994, making 53 league appearances and scoring 22 goals. In 1996, he was taken to Skonto Riga, where he showed his high scoring ability, scoring 15 goals in one season.

In 1997, he started his career abroad, joining the Ukrainian club Shakhtar Donetsk, where he spent three years, playing 48 matches and scoring 14 goals. In July 2000, he left and joined yet another big club – this time the Russian team Spartak Moscow. He quickly scored five goals in 12 games and in December of the same year was signed by the English club Fulham. Štolcers joined Fulham when they were still in the second tier of English football. However, Fulham's victorious 2000–01 Division One campaign in his first season at the club got them promoted to the Premier League, and Štolcers scored two goals in the process against West Bromwich Albion (on his debut) and Watford. These were his only two league goals for the club, and he failed to score in the Premier League, making just ten appearances over three full seasons at the top level. He did however score twice in a League Cup tie against Bury in November 2002. In 2004, he joined Yeovil Town, playing 36 league matches and scoring 7 goals in all competitions. In 2005, he left England and signed a contract in Azerbaijan with FK Baku. He only played ten games for them and scored four goals.

In 2006, he returned to his native Latvia, rejoining Skonto Riga. In the upcoming season he scored three goals in 16 matches for them and was released. In 2007, he joined JFK Olimps Rīga as the only experienced player in the team to help youngsters with their development. He played 22 matches and scored five goals from 2007 to 2009.

In 2009, he once again left Latvia, unsuccessfully trying to get into the Yeovil Town squad after being on trial, and later joining Bath City. He scored one goal in eight matches for them, and in 2010, Štolcers joined Hayes & Yeading United, where he retired from playing football with one goal in nine matches in his final season.

International career 
Štolcers's international debut for the Latvia national team came in a 0–0 draw against Denmark on 26 August 1992. He represented his country 81 times and scored seven goals. He played in the 2004 European Championships, held in Portugal.

Managerial career 
After being released from Hayes and Yeading United in May 2010, Štolcers started his coaching career. Štolcers took part in an international project called Concept4Football, helping youngsters who are not older than 16 years to develop their football abilities.

On 29 May 2011, Štolcers took part in the London Legends tournament held at Craven Cottage. In the semi-final match against Chelsea legends, he scored a goal from the penalty spot, but that did not save Fulham from losing 5–1.

In 2015, Štolcers was head coach for Stevenage FC, coaching U18's.

In 2016, Štolcers was appointed his first senior professional coaching role as head coach in Lisbon for FC G.S. De Loures.

Between 2016 and 2019 Štolcers was Head Coach for U14's and U16's in Fulham FC Foundation.

On 14 February 2019, Štolcers was appointed to his second senior professional coaching role as the head coach of Hong Kong Premier League club Eastern. He was also named the club's Technical Director. He left the club on 1 June 2020 after his contract expired.

In November 2020, he began teaching at Glyn School.

Career statistics

Club

International

Scores and results list Latvia's goal tally first, score column indicates score after each Štolcers goal.

Honors
Skonto FC
Virslīga: 1996

Fulham
Football League First Division: 2000–01

FC Baku
Azerbaijan Top League: 2005–06

Individual
Latvian League best midfielder: 1993

References

External links 
 

1974 births
Living people
Latvian people of Volga German descent
Footballers from Riga
Latvian footballers
Association football midfielders
Latvia international footballers
UEFA Euro 2004 players
Latvian Higher League players
Ukrainian Premier League players
Premier League players
Russian Premier League players
Azerbaijan Premier League players
Skonto FC players
FC Shakhtar Donetsk players
FC Spartak Moscow players
Fulham F.C. players
Yeovil Town F.C. players
FC Baku players
JFK Olimps players
Bath City F.C. players
Hayes & Yeading United F.C. players
Latvian expatriate footballers
Latvian expatriate sportspeople in England
Expatriate footballers in England
Latvian expatriate sportspeople in Russia
Expatriate footballers in Russia
Latvian expatriate sportspeople in Ukraine
Expatriate footballers in Ukraine
Latvian expatriate sportspeople in Azerbaijan
Expatriate footballers in Azerbaijan
Latvian expatriate football managers
Expatriate football managers in Hong Kong